This is a list of flag bearers who have represented Aruba at the Olympics.

Flag bearers carry the national flag of their country at the opening ceremony of the Olympic Games.

See also
Aruba at the Olympics
List of flag bearers for the Netherlands Antilles at the Olympics

References

Flag bearers
Aruba
Olympic flag bearers